Abū ʿAbdallāh Yaʿīsh ibn Ibrāhīm ibn Yūsuf ibn Simāk al-Andalusī al-Umawī  (1400? in Al-Andalus – 1489 in Damascus, Syria) was a 15th-century Spanish-Arab mathematician.

Works
Marasim al-intisab fi'ilm al-hisab ("On arithmetical rules and procedures"), first date written in 1373 and hence the birth date above is controversial.
Raf'al-ishkal fi ma'rifat al-ashkal (a work on mensuration).

References

Bibliography

Ahmad Salim Saidan (ed.), Yaish ibn Ibrahim al-Umawi, On arithmetical rules and procedures (Aleppo, 1981).

External links
 

1400 births
1489 deaths
15th-century Arabs
Mathematicians from al-Andalus
Medieval Syrian mathematicians
14th-century mathematicians
15th-century Syrian people